Lecithocera metopaena is a moth in the family Lecithoceridae. It was described by Chun-Sheng Wu and Kyu-Tek Park in 1999. It is found in Sri Lanka.

The wingspan is 12–14 mm. The forewings are brown with a black pattern. The cell-dot and discal spot are obvious, while the fold-dot is indistinct. The basal line is light brown. The hindwings are light brown.

Etymology
The species name is derived from Greek motopon (meaning brow).

References

Moths described in 1999
metopaena